Collagna is a frazione of the  comune (municipality) of Ventasso in the Province of Reggio Emilia in the Italian region Emilia-Romagna, located about  west of Bologna and about  southwest of Reggio Emilia.  It was a separate comune until 1 January 2016.

Collagna borders the following municipalities: Busana, Comano, Fivizzano, Ligonchio, Ramiseto, Sillano.

People
Giovanni Lindo Ferretti (b. 1953), singer-songwriter, born in Cerreto Alpi

References

Cities and towns in Emilia-Romagna